Tereza Štadler (29 September 1936 – 27 March 2001), née Manga, was a Yugoslav chess player who holds the title of Woman Grandmaster (WGM, 1977). She was a winner of the Yugoslav Women's Chess Championship (1964).

Biography
In the 1960s, she was one of the leading Yugoslav women's chess players. Štadler won the Yugoslav Women's Chess Championships in 1964. She is the winner of many international chess women's tournaments, including Bela Crkva (1958), Arenys de Mar (1966), Novi Sad (1978).

In 1967, Tereza Štadler participated in Women's World Chess Championship Candidates Tournament in Subotica and ranked 4th place. In 1971, she participated at Women's World Chess Championship Interzonal Tournament in Ohrid and ranked 13th place.

Štadler played for Yugoslavia in the Women's Chess Olympiads:
 In 1957, at second board in the 1st Chess Olympiad (women) in Emmen (+7, =5, -2),
 In 1969, at first board in the 4th Chess Olympiad (women) in Lublin (+5, =3, -2),
 In 1980, at third board in the 9th Chess Olympiad (women) in Valletta (+6, =0, -3) and won individual bronze medal.

In 1977, she was awarded the honorary title of FIDE Woman Grandmaster (WGM).

References

External links
 
 

1936 births
2001 deaths
Sportspeople from Subotica
Serbian female chess players
Yugoslav female chess players
Chess woman grandmasters
Chess Olympiad competitors
20th-century chess players